Lake Lefferts (Latitude: 40.414552, Longitude: -74.234589) is an engineered lake in Matawan, New Jersey. The lake is the result of the construction in 1928 of Lake Lefferts Dam, which captured and stored the flow of Matawan Creek.

The lake is home to sunnies (sunfish), bluegill, crappies, bass, catfish, and pickerel. Near Ravine Drive is a recreational outdoor area, which includes a public fishing dock, boat launch, and canoe rental. Near Route 34 is MJ's at Buttonwood Manor, which is a sports bar, dining room, and catering facility.

References

Lefferts
Lefferts